Amasya District (also: Merkez, meaning "central") is a district of Amasya Province of Turkey. Its seat is the city Amasya. Its area is 1,889 km2, and its population is 147,380 (2021).

Composition
There are two municipalities in Amasya District:
 Amasya
 Ziyaret

There are 100 villages in Amasya District:

Abacı
Aksalur
Aktaş
Akyazı
Alakadı
Albayrak
Ardıçlar
Avşar
Aydınca 
Aydınlık
Aydoğdu
Bağlarüstü
Bağlıca
Bayat
Beke
Beldağı
Boğaköy
Böke
Bulduklu
Çatalçam
Çavuşköy
Çengelkayı
Çiğdemlik
Çivi
Dadıköy
Damudere
Değirmendere
Direkli
Doğantepe
Duruca
Eliktekke
Ermiş
Eskikızılca
Ezinepazar 
Gerne
Gökdere
Gözlek
Halifeli
Hasabdal
İbecik
İlgazi
İlyas
İpekköy
Kaleboğazı
Kaleköy
Kapıkaya
Karaali
Karaçavuş
Karaibrahim
Karakese
Karaköprü
Karataş
Karsan
Kayabaşı
Kayacık
Kayrak
Keçili
Keşlik
Kızılca
Kızılkışlacık
Kızoğlu
Kızseki
Köyceğiz
Küçükkızılca
Kutu
Kuzgeçe
Mahmatlar
Meşeliçiftliği
Musaköy
Oluz
Ormanözü
Ortaköy
Ovasaray
Özfındıklı
Saraycık
Sarayözü
Sarıalan
Sarıkız
Sarımeşe
Sarıyar
Sazköy
Sevincer
Şeyhsadi
Sıracevizler
Soma
Tatar
Tuzsuz
Ümük
Uygur
Yağcıabdal
Yağmur
Yassıçal
Yavru
Yeşildere
Yeşilöz
Yıkılgan
Yıldızköy
Yolyanı
Yuvacık
Yuvaköy

References

Districts of Amasya Province